Commission v Edith Cresson (2006) C-432/04 is an EU law case, concerning the constitutional framework in the European Union.

Facts
Mrs Edith Cresson was brought to trial at the European Court of Justice by the European Commission for giving her friend Berthelot, a dental surgeon, the role of political adviser through appointing him as a visiting scientist for two and a half years. This went against the maximum duration which was 24 months for visiting scientists. This was argued to be a breach of Article 213 EC Treaty (now Article 245 TFEU), under which members of the Commission had to respect the obligations arising from their office.

Judgment
The Court of Justice, in full court, held that Mrs Cresson had breached her obligations under the Treaties.

See also

European Union law

Notes

References

Court of Justice of the European Union case law